Porlob Island is an island of the Andaman Islands. It belongs to the North and Middle Andaman administrative district, part of the Indian union territory of Andaman and Nicobar Islands.

Geography
The island belongs to the East Baratang Group and lies west of Kadamtala Beach.

Administration
Politically, Porlob Island, along neighboring East Baratang Group, is part of Rangat Taluk.

Demographics 
There is only 1 village, located at the middle of the island, but it is now uninhabited. 
It is a woodcutters camp called Porlob depot which used to be populated each summer, until 2007 when it was closed.

References 

 Geological Survey of India

Cities and towns in North and Middle Andaman district
Islands of North and Middle Andaman district
Uninhabited islands of India
Islands of India
Islands of the Bay of Bengal